Cool Woods is a studio album by the jazz alto saxophonist Phil Woods. It was released in 1999 by Somethin' Else (Toshiba EMI).

Track listing

Personnel
Phil Woods - Alto saxophone
Junko Onishi - Piano
Ron Carter - Bass
Bill Goodwin - Drums

Production
Producer - Bill Goodwin
Executive Producer - Hitoshi Namekata
Recording and Mixing Engineer - Kurt Lundvall
Assistant Engineer - Jasm Stasium
Digital Recorded at Right Track Studios, New York on January 4 & 5, 1999
Mixing Engineer - Jim Anderson
Mixed at Aviator Studios, New York on January 19, 1999
Mastering engineer - Alan Tucker, Yoshio Okazaki
Mastered at Foothill Digital New York on January 21, 1999 and Toshiba-EMI Studio Terra, Tokyo on February 20, 1999
Photograph - Takehiko Tokiwa
Art director - Yuri Tamura
A&R - Yoshiko Tsuge
 Liner notes - Yasukuni Terashima

Release history

References

1999 albums
Phil Woods albums
Junko Onishi albums
Albums recorded at MSR Studios
EMI Music Japan albums